The Yolla Bolly–Middle Eel Wilderness is a federally designated wilderness area in the Yolla Bolly Range of the southern Klamath Mountains and the Inner Northern California Coast Ranges, in Northern California.

Geography
It is within sections of eastern Mendocino County,
western Tehama County, and Trinity County.

Most of the area (172,998 acres) is managed by the US Forest Service and is within three national forest boundaries, the: Mendocino National Forest, Shasta-Trinity National Forest and Six Rivers National Forest. The remaining  is managed by the Bureau of Land Management. The name is a combination of: a phrase from the Native American Wintun language of the region's Wintun peoples, Yo-la meant snow-covered, and Bo-li meant high peak; and a reference to the Middle fork of the Eel River.

History
In 1927 U.S. Chief Forester William Greeley directed the district supervisors to study and recommend areas in the nation's forests suitable for a new classification as "wilderness". By 1929 fourteen areas in the California Region 5 forests were proposed for this designation.

The regulations for wilderness areas, known as the L-20, became − with modifications by Secretary of Agriculture William Jardine − the management policy for these areas. The L-20 Regulations used the term "primitive areas" with the purpose stated as to:

maintain primitive conditions of environment, transportation, habitation, and subsistence with a view to conserving the value of such areas for purposes of public education and recreation.

By the close of 1932 California had eighteen new primitive areas protecting .

Federal protection was given when this area became part of the National Wilderness Preservation System, created by the passage of the Wilderness Act of 1964.

Waterways
Located within the southern Klamath Mountains and Inner Northern California Coast Ranges, the rugged topography of the Yolla Bolly–Middle Eel Wilderness protects headwaters of the Middle Fork of the Eel River, the North Fork of the Eel, the Mad River, and the South Fork of the Trinity River. The eastern side has the watersheds of Cottonwood and Thomes Creeks, which flow into the Sacramento River. The very northern tip of the wilderness—around the summits of Black Rock Mountain and North Yolla Bolly Peak—are in the North Coast Range
Both the Middle and North Forks of the Eel River have Wild and Scenic River designation, as does the South Fork</ref> Land acquisition proposal on the South Fork by the Bureau of Land Management.</ref> of the Trinity River. Several small, shallow lakes occur in remnant glacial basins near the highest peaks. Numerous springs are found off of the main ridgetops.

Flora and fauna
The wilderness has Coast Range and Klamath montane, mixed evergreen and Douglas fir forest types. Conifers include the California endemic foxtail pine, ponderosa pine, red fir and white fir, western white pine, sugar pine, incense cedar, and the rare Pacific yew. Other tree species include oaks and cottonwoods. The area includes wet meadows and open grasslands supporting abundant deer herds (as well as cattle and sheep). Lower elevations have chamise, manzanita, and ceanothus.

Wildlife in the wilderness includes black bear, Roosevelt elk, black-tailed deer, gray fox, mountain lion, bobcat, coyote, northern flying squirrel, fisher and martin. The northern spotted owl can be found here, as well as eagles, hawks, turkey vultures and smaller birds like grouse, quail, and band-tailed pigeon.

Rainbow trout live in most larger streams, such as in the South Fork of Cottonwood Creek, and in Black Rock Lake. The Middle Fork Eel River watershed has summer- and winter-run steelhead and spring-run chinook salmon, but fishing is restricted.

Geology
Rocks in the northern mountains are predominantly gray greenstone while the southern mountains include sandstone and serpentine of the Franciscan formation. Cirque basins from former glaciers are seen above about  elevation. Extensive faulting in the rocks makes the region prone to erosion, slumping and landslides. One modern landslide near Ides Cove, on the north flank of Mount Linn, reached more than two miles (3 km) toward the South Fork Cottonwood Creek, upending old-growth forests and leaving large fissures on its perimeter.

Recreation
Recreational activities include backpacking, day-hiking, camping, fishing, hunting, and nature photography. There are 15 trailheads all around the wilderness boundary with the most frequent users being hunters in the autumn months. Visitor use has one of the lowest densities among wilderness areas in California.
This trailhead is also the beginning of the Bigfoot Trail. The US Forest Service encourages visitors to use Leave No Trace ethics when visiting the wilderness to minimize impact to the environment.

Access to trailheads on the northwest side of the wilderness is available by paved road from Ruth. Other roads suitable for most passenger vehicles reach the south boundary from Covelo and the east boundary from Corning or Red Bluff.

See also

Footnotes

References

 Adkinson, Ron Wild Northern California. The Globe Pequot Press, 2001
 Godfrey, Anthony The Ever-Changing View – A History of the National Forests in California USDA Forest Service Publishers, 2005 
 Wuerthner, George "California Wilderness Areas". Westcliffe Publishers, 1997.
 Shechter, Mordechai, and Robert C. Lucas "Simulation of Recreational Use for Park and Wilderness Management". Resources for the Future, 1979.

External links
 USDA Forest Service: official website
 Wilderness.net: Yolla Bolly-Middle Eel Wilderness website
 Mendocino National Forest: wilderness area

Wilderness areas of California
Klamath Mountains
Protected areas of Mendocino County, California
Protected areas of Tehama County, California
Protected areas of Trinity County, California
Mendocino National Forest
Shasta-Trinity National Forest
Six Rivers National Forest
Bureau of Land Management areas in California
Protected areas established in 1964
1964 establishments in California